Sportswashing is a term used to describe the practice of individuals, groups, corporations, or governments using sports to improve reputations tarnished by wrongdoing. A form of propaganda, sportswashing can be accomplished through hosting sporting events, purchasing or sponsoring sporting teams, or participating in a sport.

At the international level, it is believed that sportswashing has been used to direct attention away from poor human rights records and corruption scandals. At the individual and corporate levels, it is believed that sportswashing has been used to cover up vices, crimes, and scandals. Sportswashing is an example of reputation laundering.

Overview 

Internationally, sportswashing has been described as part of a country's soft power. Russia's hosting of the 2018 FIFA World Cup has been cited as an example, as the country's global reputation was low due to its foreign policy and the event changed the focus of discussions to the success of the World Cup.

People from countries accused of sportswashing often argue that they simply want to enjoy sporting events in their home countries and that sporting boycotts and event relocation are both unfair to sporting fans and are ineffective in changing government policy.

Companies that have been accused of sportswashing include Ineos' sponsorship of Team Sky (now the Ineos Grenadiers) in 2019, and Arabtec's sponsorship of Manchester City F.C.

Sportswashing is often very costly to the entity using it. For example, in March 2021, human rights organization Grant Liberty said that Saudi Arabia alone has spent at least $1.5 billion on alleged sportswashing activities.

Corporate sponsorship 

 Russian state-owned oil company Gazprom's sponsorship of the German Bundesliga football team Schalke 04, events of the UEFA Champions League and kits. This contract was cancelled due to the Russian invasion of Ukraine in 2022.
 Russian holding company USM Holdings Limited's sponsorship of Everton F.C.; the company is owned by Alisher Usmanov, a pro-Kremlin businessman.

 Qatar Airways' sponsorships of football teams, including FC Barcelona, A.S. Roma, Boca Juniors, Paris Saint-Germain F.C., and FC Bayern Munich.
 Qatar's Hamad International Airport's sponsorship of Bayern Munich since 2018.
 Brunei's flag carrier Royal Brunei Airlines' sponsorship deal with AFL Europe in 2014. The sponsorship deal ended the same year after protests from rights groups.
 Venezuelan state-owned oil company PDVSA's sponsorship of Formula One driver Pastor Maldonado who raced for Williams Grand Prix Engineering in 2011–2013 and Lotus F1 in 2014–2015. The PDVSA logo was included on both teams' car decals during those periods.
 Chinese state-owned broadcaster CCTV's sponsorship of Jordan Grand Prix Formula One team in 2003.
 Bahrain's flag carrier Gulf Air's sponsorships of Chelsea F.C. and Queens Park Rangers F.C.
 Saudi Arabia State-owned oil company Aramco's sponsorship of the Aston Martin Formula One team, as well as Formula One races.
 Saudi Arabian flag carrier Saudia's sponsorship of Formula One team Williams Grand Prix Engineering from 1977 to 1984.
 Russian flag carrier Aeroflot's sponsorship of Manchester United. The sponsorship was ended following the Russian invasion of Ukraine. 
 The Rwanda tourism authority's sponsorship of Arsenal.
 The Azerbaijan tourism authority's sponsorship of Atlético Madrid.
 The Saudi Arabia Public Investment Fund-backed NEOM sponsorship of McLaren Formula E and Extreme E racing teams.
 Shell oil company's major partnership with British Cycling in 2022.
 Hong Kong-based insurance company AIA Group sponsorship of English football club Tottenham Hotspur F.C.. AIA Group endorsed the Hong Kong national security law in 2020, which was condemned by several British politicians who demanded the team to drop the sponsorship.
 The Formula 1 team Haas F1 was sponsored by Uralkali, they have since severed ties with them due to the Russo-Ukrainian War
 The Saudi Tourism Authority's sponsorship of the 2022 FIFA Club World Cup under the Visit Saudi branding

Hosting

Basketball 
 The 1978 FIBA World Championship, held in the Philippines under Ferdinand Marcos.
 The 2013 FIBA Americas Championship, held in Venezuela.
 The 2019 FIBA Basketball World Cup, held in China.
 The 2021 BAL season, held in Rwanda.
 The 2023 FIBA Basketball World Cup, partially held in the Philippines under Ferdinand Marcos' son Bongbong Marcos.

Boxing 
 The 1973 light heavyweight boxing match between South African Pierre Fourie and American Bob Foster, held in Rand Stadium, Johannesburg, South Africa during the apartheid era.
 The 1974 undisputed world heavyweight title match between George Foreman and Muhammad Ali, known as The Rumble in the Jungle, held in Kinshasa, Zaire (now Democratic Republic of the Congo).
 The 1975 world heavyweight title trilogy match between Muhammad Ali and Joe Frazier, known as Thrilla in Manila, held in Quezon City, Philippines during the dictatorship of Ferdinand Marcos.
 The 1980 WBA World Heavyweight Championship match between Gerrie Coetzee and Mike Weaver, held in Sun City, South Africa during the apartheid era.
 The 2015 AIBA World Boxing Championships held in Qatar.
 The 2019 world heavyweight title rematch between Andy Ruiz Jr. and Anthony Joshua, known as Clash on The Dunes, held in Diriyah, Saudi Arabia.

Cycling 
 Vuelta a Venezuela held since 1963.
 Vuelta a Cuba held in 1964–2010.
 Vuelta al Táchira held since 1966.
 Tour of Qatar held in 2002–2016.
 Tour of Beijing held in 2011–2014.
 Dubai Tour held in 2014–2018.
 Abu Dhabi Tour held in 2015–2018.
 2016 UCI Road World Championships held in Qatar.
 Tour of Guangxi held since 2017.
 Second stage of 2018 Giro d'Italia held in Israel.
 UAE Tour held since 2019
 Tour Femenino de Venezuela held in 2019.
 Tour of Oman held since 2020.
 The 2025 UCI Road World Championships scheduled to be held in Rwanda.

Football tournaments 

 The 1934 FIFA World Cup held during the rule of Benito Mussolini in Italy.
 The 1964 European Nations' Cup held in Spain under the dictatorship of Francisco Franco.
 The 1972 AFC Asian Cup held in Thailand under a military dictatorship.
 The 1978 FIFA World Cup held in Argentina under a military dictatorship.
 The 1985 FIFA World Youth Championship held in Soviet Union.
 The 1985 FIFA U-16 World Championship held in China.
 The 1988 AFC Asian Cup held in Qatar.
 The 1989 FIFA World Youth Championship held in Saudi Arabia.
 The 1991 FIFA Women's World Cup held in China.
 The 1995 FIFA World Youth Championship held in Qatar.
 The 2002 Supercoppa Italiana between Juventus and Parma held in Libya under Muammar Gaddafi.
 The 2004 AFC Asian Cup held in China.
 The 2007 FIFA Women's World Cup held in China (initially awarded the 2003 bid but moved to the United States due to SARS).
 The 2007 Copa América held in Venezuela.
 The 2009 FIFA Club World Cup and 2010 FIFA Club World Cup were both held in the United Arab Emirates.
 The 2011 AFC Asian Cup held in Qatar.
 The 2013 Trophée des Champions between Paris Saint-Germain and Bordeaux held in Gabon.
 The 2014 FIFA World Cup held in Brazil.
 The 2017 FIFA Club World Cup and 2018 FIFA Club World Cup were both held in the United Arab Emirates.
 The 2018 FIFA World Cup held in Russia.
 The Supercoppa Italiana held two controversial football matches in Saudi Arabia:
 The 2018 Supercoppa Italiana between Juventus and AC Milan held in Jeddah, Saudi Arabia.
 The 2019 Supercoppa Italiana between Juventus and S.S. Lazio held in Riyadh, Saudi Arabia.

 The 2019 UEFA Europa League Final between Chelsea and Arsenal held in Azerbaijan
 The 2019 FIFA Club World Cup and the 2020 FIFA Club World Cup were both held in Qatar.
 The Supercopa de España held football matches in Saudi Arabia:
 2019–2020 Supercopa de España held in Jeddah, Saudi Arabia.
 2021–2022 Supercopa de España held in Jeddah, Saudi Arabia.
 2022–2023 Supercopa de España held in Riyadh, Saudi Arabia.
 The Euro 2020 held in various countries, including the countries with poor human rights record:
 Group F and round of 16 held in Budapest, Hungary
 Group A and quarter-finals held in Baku, Azerbaijan
 Group B, Group E and quarter-finals held in Saint Petersburg, Russia
 The 2021 Copa América held in Brazil.
 The 2021 Diego Maradona tribute match between FC Barcelona and Boca Juniors dubbed as "Maradona Cup" held in Saudi Arabia.
 The 2021 Trophée des Champions between Lille and Paris Saint-Germain in Israel.
 The 2021 Africa Cup of Nations held in Cameroon.
 The 2021 FIFA Club World Cup held in the United Arab Emirates.
 The 2022 Trophée des Champions between Paris Saint-Germain and Nantes also held in the same place as last season.
 The 2022 FIFA World Cup in Qatar.
 The 2023 AFC Asian Cup to be held in Qatar (originally in China)
 The 2023 FIFA Club World Cup to be held in Saudi Arabia
 The 2027 AFC Asian Cup to be held in Saudi Arabia

Esports 
 The 2019 BLAST Pro Series Finals held in the Kingdom of Bahrain.
 Danish esports organization, RFRSH Entertainment and Riot Games both signing a deal to develop Saudi Arabia's NEOM project and boost esports in the region. Riot ended up scrapping the partnership after facing intense backlash from fans and their employees.
 The 2022 Blast Premier World Final held in Abu Dhabi, United Arab Emirates.

Golf 
 PGA Tour China held since 2014.
 China Tour held in 2014–2019.
 Saudi International held since 2019.
 Aramco Team Series held since 2020.
 Aramco Saudi Ladies International held since 2020.
 LIV Golf Invitational Series funded by the government of Saudi Arabia, beginning in 2022.

Motorsport

Formula One 

 Spanish Grand Prix held from 1951 to 1975
 Argentine Grand Prix held from 1953 to 1981
 Portuguese Grand Prix held from 1958 to 1960
 South African Grand Prix held from 1960 to 1985
 Mexican Grand Prix held since 1962
 Brazilian Grand Prix held from 1972 to 1984
 Hungarian Grand Prix held since 1986
 Malaysian Grand Prix held from 1999 to 2017
 Bahrain Grand Prix held since 2004
 Chinese Grand Prix held since 2004
 Abu Dhabi Grand Prix held since 2009
 Russian Grand Prix held from 2014 to 2021
 2016 European Grand Prix held in Baku, Azerbaijan
 Azerbaijan Grand Prix held since 2017
 Turkish Grand Prix held in 2020 and 2021
 Qatar Grand Prix held since 2021
 Saudi Arabian Grand Prix held since 2021

Formula E 
 Beijing ePrix held in 2014–2015.
 Putrajaya ePrix held in 2014–2015.
 Moscow ePrix held in 2015.
 Diriyah ePrix held since 2018.
 Sanya ePrix held in 2019.
 Jakarta ePrix held since 2022.

Grand Prix Motorcycle Racing 
 East German motorcycle Grand Prix held in 1958–1972.
 Argentine motorcycle Grand Prix held in 1981–1982.
 South African motorcycle Grand Prix held in 1983–1985.
 Malaysian motorcycle Grand Prix held since 1991.
 Indonesian motorcycle Grand Prix held in 1996–1997 and since 2022.
 Qatar motorcycle Grand Prix held since 2004.
 Chinese motorcycle Grand Prix held from 2005 to 2008.
 Thailand motorcycle Grand Prix held since 2018.

Rally 
 Qatar International Rally held since 1983.
 Rally Indonesia held between 1996 and 1997 respectively.
 Rally China held  in 1999 season only.
 Rally of Turkey held from 2003 until 2006, then in 2008 and 2010, and then again from 2018 until 2020.
 Jordan Rally held in 2008, 2010 and 2011.
 The Dakar Rally held in Saudi Arabia since 2020.

Olympic Games 

 The 1936 Winter Olympics held in Garmisch-Partenkirchen, Nazi Germany.
 The 1936 Summer Olympics in Berlin, Nazi Germany.
 The 1968 Summer Olympics held in Mexico City, Mexico.
 The 1980 Summer Olympics held in Moscow, Russian SFSR, Soviet Union.
 The 1988 Summer Olympics held in military-led Seoul, South Korea.
 The 2008 Summer Olympics held in Beijing, China.
 The 2014 Winter Olympics held in Sochi, Russia.
 The 2016 Summer Olympics held in Rio de Janeiro, Brazil.
 The 2022 Winter Olympics held in Beijing, China.

Rugby Union 

Rugby Union tours involving South Africa during the Apartheid era:

 The 1949, 1960, 1970, 1976 New Zealand tours to South Africa
 The 1951–1952, 1960–1961, 1965, 1969–1970 South African tours to Britain and Ireland
 The 1952, 1961, 1968, 1974 South Africa tours to France
 The 1953, 1961, 1963, 1969 Australia tours to South Africa
 The 1955, 1962, 1968, 1974, 1980 British & Irish Lions tours to South Africa
 The 1956, 1965, 1971 South Africa tours to Australia
 The 1956, 1965, 1981 South Africa tours to New Zealand
 The 1958, 1964, 1967, 1971, 1975, 1980 France tours to South Africa
 The 1960 Scotland tour to South Africa
 The 1964 Wales tour to South Africa
 The 1965, 1971 Argentina tours to South Africa both with tests against the South African Gazelles
 The 1972, 1984 England tours to South Africa
 The 1973 Italy tour to South Africa
 The 1980 South African tour to South America
 The 1980, 1982 and 1984 South American Jaguars tours to South Africa
 The 1981 Ireland tour to South Africa
 The unofficial 1986 New Zealand tour to South Africa

During communist rule, Romania undertook several Rugby Union tours:
 The 1973 Romania tour to Argentina
 The 1975 Romania tour to New Zealand
 The 1979 Romania tour to Wales
 The 1980 Romania tour to Ireland
 The 1981 Romania tour to Scotland
 The 1984–1985 Romania tour to England

During military rule in Fiji, the country's Rugby Union team went on numerous overseas tours:
 The 1989 Fiji tour to Europe
 The 1989 Fiji tour to Oceania
 The 1990 Fiji tour to Hong Kong and France
 The 1995 Fiji tour to Wales and Ireland
 The 1996 Fiji tour to Hong Kong
 The 1996 Fiji tour to New Zealand and South Africa
 The 1997 Fiji tour to New Zealand

During the 1976–1983 military dictatorship in Argentina, seven countries played against Argentina's Rugby Union team: New Zealand, Australia, Fiji, Wales, England, Italy and France.
 The 1976 Argentina tour to Wales with one provincial match in England v North & Midlands
 The 1976 New Zealand tour to Argentina with a match against Uruguay
 The 1977 France tour to Argentina
 The 1978 Argentina tour to England with a match in Wales a unofficial international against Wales B a provincial match in Ireland v Leinster and a test match in Italy
 The 1979 Argentina tour to New Zealand
 The 1979 Australia tour to Argentina
 The 1980 Fiji tour to Argentina
 The 1981 England tour to Argentina
 The 1982 Argentina tour to France and Spain
 The 1983 Argentina tour to Australia

Tennis 
 South Africa Open during the apartheid period (1948-1994).
 1972 Federation Cup held in apartheid South Africa.
 1974 Davis Cup held in apartheid South Africa.
 St. Petersburg Open held since 1993.
 Dubai Tennis Championships held since 1993.
 ATP Qatar Open held since 1993.
 WTA Qatar Open held since 2001.
 China Open held since 2004.
 Wuhan Open held since 2014.
 2017 Fed Cup held in Belarus
 Diriyah Tennis Cup held since 2019.

Wrestling 
 Collision in Korea held in Pyongyang, North Korea in 1995.
 WWE in Saudi Arabia held in Saudi Arabia since 2014.
 WWE Crown Jewel held in Saudi Arabia since 2018.

Other events 

 Some of UFC matches are held in China, Russia, and the United Arab Emirates.
 Proposed NFL games in China, including the China Bowl.
 The 1986 Commonwealth Games held in Scotland.
 The 1991 Pan American Games held in Cuba.
 The 1998 Commonwealth Games  held in Malaysia. 
 The 2006 Asian Games held in Qatar.
 The 2014 Men's Ice Hockey World Championships held in Belarus.
 The 2015 European Games held in Azerbaijan.
 The 2017 Asian Indoor and Martial Arts Games held in Turkmenistan.
 The Women's World Chess Championship 2017 held in Iran.
 The 2018 Asian Games held in Indonesia.
 The 2019 Winter Universiade held in Russia.
 The 2019 European Games held in Belarus.
 The 2019 Military World Games held in China.
 The 2019 Southeast Asian Games held in The Philippines.
 The 2021 Summer World University Games scheduled to be held in China after a 2-year delay from its original dates.
 The World Chess Championship 2021 held in the United Arab Emirates.
 The 2022 Gay Games scheduled to be held in Hong Kong.
The 2022 World Aquatics Championships held in Budapest.
 The 2022 Asian Games scheduled to be held in China.
 The 2030 Asian Games scheduled to be held in Qatar.
 The 2034 Asian Games scheduled to be held in Saudi Arabia.

Ownership

Association football 
 Italian media proprietor Silvio Berlusconi, through his Fininvest holding, owned Serie A club Milan AC in 1986 and had 98% of the club's share until 2017. Berlusconi gained popularity in the country using his team's success, strongly supported by his own mass media including Mediaset, to improve public opinion, which was useful for his political purposes. He founded Forza Italia, a center-right party, and in 1994 became Prime Minister of the country. During more than two decades of government divided into four periods, Berlusconi was involved in abuse of office, bribery, corruption of public personnel and false accounting cases as well as sex scandals, among other controversies. He proposed and approved many ad personam laws (a type of clientelism) in favour of his own business, including the Milanese club as the Lentini affair in 1995, the Decreto salva-calcio in 2003, which allowed Milan to be relieved its debt of € 242 million, and the decriminalisation of false accounting during his second government, a charge for which his club and local rival Internazionale were tried and acquitted five years later due that measure; obtaining political support from the Milan fanbase, one of the largest in the country. In 2018, after he sold Milan to Chinese businessman Li Yonghong, Berlusconi, through Fininvest, owned A.C. Monza, club which then competed in the national Serie C, with 100% of the club's shares. 
 Russian politician and businessman Roman Abramovich's ownership of Chelsea F.C. (2003–2022), which some have reported was done at the request of Russian President Vladimir Putin.
 Russian pro-Kremlin businessman Alisher Usmanov formally owned partial shares of Arsenal F.C.
 Abu Dhabi majority ownership of City Football Group. In 2015, the Abu Dhabi United Group announced consortium with Chinese State-owned CITIC Group for City Football Group, an entity which in turn owns
Manchester City F.C. (since 2008)
Melbourne City FC
Montevideo City Torque
New York City FC,
Yokohama F. Marinos,
Girona FC,
Sichuan Jiuniu F.C. (partially).
Mumbai City FC (partially).
 Saudi prince Abdullah bin Musaid Al Saud ownership of Sheffield United.

 The purchase of Newcastle United F.C., 80% financing provided by Saudi Arabia Public Investment Fund, this was "a blatant example of Saudi sportswashing", according to Kate Allen of Amnesty International UK.
 Kingdom of Bahrain 20% stake purchase of French football club Paris FC. The purchase was condemned by French-based human rights NGOs.
 Tamim bin Hamad Al Thani, ruler of Qatar, purchasing French football club Paris Saint-Germain (PSG) in 2011.
 Controversial Indonesian conglomerate Bakrie Group ownership of Australian football club Brisbane Roar FC. In 2019, formed team administrator Joko Driyono was arrested by the Indonesian national police for destroying the evidence of match-fixing scandal.
 Washington Spirit's 2020 cultural exchange with Qatar.

Basketball 
 Russian businessman Mikhail Prokhorov ownership of NBA team Brooklyn Nets. Prokhorov was known to be a close ally to Russian President Vladimir Putin. In 2017, Prokhorov sold the team which was alleged to be a request from Putin. The team was later bought by Hong Kong businessman Joe Tsai. Tsai was previously criticized for his praise of China's restrictions on personal freedoms and expressing his support of Hong Kong national security law.

Cricket 
 The South Africa national cricket team held numerous tours dubbed as South African rebel tours around 1982-1990, defying sporting bodies' sanctions of numerous South African sport teams for participating in international sporting events. The tours have been regarded as part of the apartheid government's sporting propaganda

Cycling 
 There are numerous reports that 2020 Tour de France was used by problematic countries and companies to sportswash their tarnished reputation; the following teams have been accused of sportswashing during the event:
 Ineos Grenadiers
 Israel Start-Up Nation
 UAE Team Emirates
 Bahrain–McLaren

Motorsport 
 Kingdom of Bahrain State-owned sovereign wealth fund, Mumtalakat Holding Company, partial stake at McLaren Group which includes its racing division, McLaren Racing, which competes in Formula One, Formula E, Extreme E and IndyCar Series.

Other 
 The Al Maktoum family's ownership of Godolphin and Essential Quality.
 The takeover of ESL, a major esports organizer and production company, by Saudi Arabia's Public Investment Fund.

By individuals 

 Daniel Kinahan's involvement in boxing as a promoter.
 Brother of Venezuelan PSUV politician and Bolibourgeoisie Jesse Chacón, Arné Chacón ownership of stable in Florida called Gadu Racing Stable Corp and participation of horse racing in United States.
 Chechnya leader Ramzan Kadyrov ownership of horse Mourilyan which competed in Melbourne Cup horse racing. The participation has gained controversy in Australia. Australian Senator Bob Brown called the Australian government to quarantine the prize money as concern of money laundering. and having runners in various meetings in the UK especially Royal Ascot
 International Cycling Union presenting a certificate of appreciation to Turkmen dictator Gurbanguly Berdimuhamedow for "in development of sport and consolidation of universal peace and progress".

See also
 Greenwashing
 Pinkwashing (LGBT)
 Politics and sports
 Potemkin village
 Reputation laundering
 Soft power
 Spin (propaganda)
 Sport sanctions

References 

Human rights
Deception
Promotion and marketing communications
Propaganda
Sports controversies
Politics and sports